Herbert Zimmermann (born 10 January 1944) is a German neuroscientist who pioneered the studies on the biochemical, structural and functional heterogeneity of cholinergic synaptic vesicles from the electric organ of the electric ray Torpedo, and the functional and biochemical characterization of enzymes hydrolyzing extracellular nucleotides.

Biography 
Herbert Zimmermann was born in Chiesch (now Chyše, Czech Republic). He studied chemistry and biology at the Ludwig Maximilian University of Munich (1964–69) and obtained his PhD at the University of Regensburg in 1971. From 1972-73 he continued as postdoctoral fellow at the Department of Biochemistry at the University of Cambridge, UK. From 1973-79 he was scientist and senior scientist at the Department of Neurochemistry of the Max Planck Institute for Biophysical Chemistry in Göttingen (Germany). From 1980–83 he held the position of Professor of Neurobiology at the University of Oldenburg (Germany). In 1983 he was appointed chair and section leader of Neurochemistry at the Goethe University Frankfurt am Main (Germany). In 1987 he was visiting professor at the Institute of Brain Research of the Medical Faculty of the Tokyo University (Tokyo Daigaku). From 1991 to 1995 he was elected president of the German Neuroscience Society. 2008 he was elected president of the German Purine Club. After his retirement (2010) he continued as emeritus in the Department of Molecular and Cellular Neurobiology of the Goethe University. Since 2009 he is president of the Scientific Society at the Johann Wolfgang Goethe-University Frankfurt am Main.

Research  
Zimmermann's initial studies in Munich and Regensburg under the supervision of Helmut Altner addressed a circumventricular organ specific for fishes, the saccus vasculosus. In Cambridge, in the laboratory of Victor P. Whittaker, he began his studies on the dynamics of the synaptic vesicle compartment. He used the electric ray electric organ that is homologous to the neuromuscular junction as a model system for cholinergic synaptic transmission. This system permitted parallel electrophysiological stimulation and recording and electron microscopic and in particular biochemical analysis of the outcome of the synaptic activation on the synaptic vesicle compartment. He showed that nerve stimulation induces both morphological and biochemical heterogeneity of synaptic vesicles. Vesicles that had gone through at least on cycle of exo- and endocytosis where reduced in size, could be separated by density centrifugation or chromatography on porous glass beads and were preferentially refilled with newly synthesized acetylcholine and ATP. This was in contrast to the reserve pool of synaptic vesicles that was not yet involved in the transmission process. The data suggested that synaptic activation induces synaptic vesicle heterogeneity whereby reloaded synaptic vesicles preferentially release newly synthesized acetylcholine and ATP. They provided a cell biological explanation for a previously unresolved problem in the earlier history of neurotransmission, namely that newly synthesized acetylcholine is preferentially released from stimulated nerve endings. He further showed that ATP released from the electric nerves is hydrolyzed extracellularly to adenosine that is recycled via a high affinity transport mechanism into the nerve terminals where it is rephosphorylated and taken up in the form of ATP into synaptic vesicles. Starting from the observation that ATP is hydrolyzed extracellularly he analyzed the biochemical pathways leading to the extracellular breakdown of released nucleotides to their respective nucleosides. This resulted in the isolation and molecular cloning of the AMP-hydrolyzing enzyme ecto-5'-nucleotidase as well as of a number of the nucleoside triphosphate and diphosphate-hydrolyzing enzymes of the family of the ectonucleoside triphosphate diphosphohydrolases. He also initiated a new nomenclature for these enzymes and for the ectopyrophosphatase/phosphodiesterases. More recently he analyzed the proteome of synaptic vesicles and the role of nucleotide signaling in the control of adult neurogenesis, the formation of new neurons in the adult mammalian brain.

Awards
 2006: Geoffrey Burnstock Lecture, Ferrara, Italy
 2007: Elected to Correspondent Academician of the Real Academia Nacional de Farmacia, Spain
 2009: Elected to Academia Europaea 
 2013: Giuliana Fassina Award of the Italian Purine Club

Selected publications 
 Altner, H, Zimmermann, H. (1972) "The saccus vasculosus" In: The Structure and Function of Nervous Tissue, Vol. V. Bourne E.G. (Ed.) Academic Press, New York and London. Ch. 19, pp 293–328 .
 
 
 
 
 
 
 Kreutzberg, G.W., Reddington, M., Zimmermann, H. (eds.) (1986) Cellular Biology of Ectoenzymes. Springer Verlag, Berlin, Heidelberg, New York, Tokyo. 
 
 
 Zimmermann, H. (1993) Synaptic Transmission. Cellular and Molecular Basis. Thieme/Oxford, University Press, . 
 
 Illes, P., Zimmermann H. (eds.) (1999) Nucleotides and their Receptors in the Nervous System. Elesevier, Amsterdam, New York, Oxford, Tokyo.

References 

1944 births
Living people
German neuroscientists
Ludwig Maximilian University of Munich alumni
University of Regensburg alumni
Sudeten German people
People from Sudetenland
People from Karlovy Vary District
Presidents of the German Neuroscience Society